Eric Lange (born February 19, 1973) is an American actor. He is known for his work on television, where he has appeared in a wide variety of both supporting and leading roles.

Lange played the recurring roles of Stuart Radzinsky on the ABC series Lost (2009) and Erwin Sikowitz in the Nickelodeon series Victorious (2010–13), and had his mainstream breakthrough for playing David Tate/Kenneth Hasting on the FX series The Bridge (2013). He earned acclaim for starring as Bill Stechner on the crime drama Narcos (2016) and Lyle Mitchell on Showtime's Escape at Dannemora (2018), which earned a nomination for the Critics' Choice Television Award for Best Supporting Actor in a Movie/Miniseries.

Lange's film roles include Sam Larson in the independent film AM1200 (2008), Andy Beyer in the sports drama Secretariat (2010), Dr. Silverman in the comedy-drama Danny Collins (2015), Whitehurst in the neo-Western mystery Wind River (2017), and Blake Denton/Him in the horror Antebellum (2020).

Early and personal life
Eric Lange was born in Hamilton, Ohio and graduated from Fairfield High School and Miami University in Oxford, Ohio. He has Danish ancestry. He is married to Lisa Sabatino, who works as a sales rep in California. They married on November 9, 2013 and have two children.

Lange quit drinking around 2021.

Career

Lange's first film role came in 1996's High School High, where he played a singing waiter. Two years later, he appeared in three episodes of the daytime drama The Bold and the Beautiful. With 2001 came a guest role in the popular series Angel, and the following year he was cast in a one-episode part in Firefly.

Over the next three years, he appeared in minor roles on several television shows, including CSI, The Bernie Mac Show, Without a Trace, The Shield, and The West Wing. Lange also appeared in a 2007 episode of Entourage and appeared briefly on the short-lived NBC show Journeyman.

In 2008, he appeared in an episode of Criminal Minds, as well as in small roles in Bones and My Name is Earl. In 2010, he appeared in 2 episodes of Weeds.

Lange portrayed Manager Erik on the television comedy Easy to Assemble. He has also guest starred on Law and Order: Special Victims Unit, and My Name is Earl, and from 2010 to 2013 portrayed Mr. Sikowitz, an eccentric acting teacher, on Nickelodeon's teen show Victorious. On June 11, 2011, Lange guest starred on iCarly in "iParty with Victorious", the first ever iCarly and Victorious crossover event.

Lange also portrayed a distraught basketball coach in the ABC television show Modern Family. In 2006, he guest starred on Cold Case, in which he played "Lyle".

In 2010, Lange portrayed John Skrzynsky in the HBO movie You Don't Know Jack, the biography of controversial doctor Jack Kevorkian. His role was Andy Beyer in the Disney film Secretariat. Lange had a recurring role in Weeds as journalist Vaughn Coleman.

In 2013, he played a role in Grimm in Season 2, Episode 16. In 2015, he played Dr. Silverman in Danny Collins.

The year following, he appeared as Officer Smith in Fear, Inc. He had a main role on the Netflix drama series Narcos as Bill Stechner, a corrupt CIA agent, which earned him recognition.

In November 2019, it was announced that Lange would appear in a main role on the Netflix horror drama miniseries Brand New Cherry Flavor. The miniseries was released on August 13, 2021.

Filmography

Film

Television

Awards and nominations

References

External links
 
 
 
 

1973 births
Male actors from Ohio
American male film actors
American male television actors
American people of Danish descent
Living people
People from Hamilton, Ohio
20th-century American male actors
21st-century American male actors
Miami University alumni